An owner-driver in NASCAR is a NASCAR driver who fully or partially owns the team they are driving for full-time or part-time.  The practice has been established since the beginning of NASCAR in 1949. However, owner-drivers are almost nonexistent today in the NASCAR Cup Series, primarily due to the expense and responsibilities involved, essentially having two jobs in one. However, there are many owner-driver teams in the lower tier Xfinity Series and Craftsman Truck Series. Owner-driver is not to be confused with a driver who owns a separate team, such as Dale Earnhardt, who fielded his own team but still drove for RCR.

History
When NASCAR started in the late 1940s nearly all drivers owned their cars and would drive their car to the track.  While sponsorship was useful, it was not essential to win at this time, leaving less burden for the driver.  But by the 1970s and 1980s more and more drivers drove for another team.  Since 1980, with the exception of Alan Kulwicki and Tony Stewart (1992 and 2011, respectively), no NASCAR Cup Series champion was an owner-driver.

Notable owner-drivers in NASCAR's national series

The following list is a list of owner-drivers:
 Lee Petty 1949–1961 (Petty Enterprises)
 Herb Thomas 1949–1956
 Buck Baker 1949–1957
 Neil Castles 1957–1976
 Richard Petty 1958–1983; 1986–1992 (Petty Enterprises)
 Wendell Scott 1961–1973
 J.D. McDuffie 1963–1991
 John Sears 1964–1973
 Junior Johnson 1965 (Junior Johnson & Associates)
 James Hylton 1968–1993 (Hylton Motorsports)
 Cecil Gordon 1970–1983
 Richard Childress 1969; 1972; 1976–1981 (Richard Childress Racing)
 Dave Marcis 1969–1974; 1977; 1979–1983; 1985–2002 (Marcis Auto Racing)
 Darrell Waltrip 1972; 1991–1997 (Darrell Waltrip Motorsports)
 Jimmy Means 1978–1993 (Means Racing)
 Bobby Gerhart 1984–2018 (Gerhart Racing)
 Alan Kulwicki 1986–1993 (AK Racing)
 Cale Yarborough 1986–1987 (Cale Yarborough Motorsports)
 Morgan Shepherd 1986–present (Shepherd Racing Ventures)
 Geoff Bodine 1993–1997 (Geoff Bodine Racing)
 Joe Nemechek 1993; 1995; 2009–present (NEMCO Motorsports)
 Kevin Lepage 1994–1996 
 Ricky Rudd 1994–1999 (Rudd Performance Motorsports)
 Bill Elliott 1995–2000 (Bill Elliott Racing)
 Brett Bodine 1996–2003 (Brett Bodine Racing)
 Kyle Petty 1997–1998 (PE2/Petty Enterprises)
 Derrike Cope 2001–2003, 2008–2010, 2012–2017 (Derrike Cope Racing) (StarCom Racing)
 Kevin Harvick 2001–2011 (Kevin Harvick Incorporated)
 Michael Waltrip 2002-2015 (Michael Waltrip Racing)
 Dale Earnhardt Jr. 2003–present (JR Motorsports)
 Robby Gordon 2005–2012 (Robby Gordon Motorsports)
 Mike Harmon 2007–present (Mike Harmon Racing)
 Norm Benning 2008–present (Norm Benning Racing)
 Brad Keselowski 2008–2015, 2022–present (Brad Keselowski Racing) (Roush Fenway Keselowski)
 Jeremy Clements 2008–2009, 2011–present (Jeremy Clements Racing)
 Jeremy Mayfield 2009 (Mayfield Motorsports)
 Chris Fontaine 2009–present (Glenden Enterprises)
 Tony Stewart 2009–2016 (Stewart-Haas Racing)
 Kyle Busch 2010–present (Kyle Busch Motorsports)
 Jennifer Jo Cobb 2010–present (Jennifer Jo Cobb Racing)
 Clay Greenfield 2013–present (Clay Greenfield Motorsports)
 Carl Long 2014–present (MBM Motorsports)
 B. J. McLeod 2015–present (B. J. McLeod Motorsports) (Live Fast Motorsports)
 Chad Finley 2016–present (Chad Finley Racing)
 Stewart Friesen 2016–present (Halmar Friesen Racing)
 Jordan Anderson 2018–present (Jordan Anderson Racing)
 Korbin Forrister 2018–2020 (All Out Motorsports)
 David Gilliland 2018–present (DGR-Crosley)
 Bo LeMastus 2018 (DGR-Crosley)
 Josh Reaume 2018–present (Reaume Brothers Racing)

References

Owner-Driver
Owner-Driver
Owner-Driver
Owner-Driver